FreeMan 2 is the eighth album by Filipino rapper Francis Magalona, released on September 23, 2000, by BMG Records (Pilipinas) and Greater East Asia Music. The album is the follow-up to 1995's FreeMan. The song "Watawat" was previously released on the EP Interscholastic, with its music video paying tribute to the evolution of the Philippine flag. The carrier single "Luv 4 Lyf" a song about war and man's struggle for freedom.

Track listing

Personnel 
Francis Magalona - Vocals

Hardware Syndrome Members:
Boyet Aquino - Drums & Percussions
Carlo Sison - Guitar
Francis Villanueva - Bass
DJ Kimozave - Turntable & Drum Machine

Additional Musicians:
Evil Stepsisters - Additional Vocals
Perfecto De Castro, Noel Mendez - Additional Guitars, back up vocals on "Luv 4 Lyf"
Ollie Marasigan: Spoken Words On "Ollie"
Michael V: Spoken Words On "Bilib Ka Ba?"
Chris Haranhan: Spoken Words on "Good Friends"
Miguel Jeteau: French Spoken Words on "Wala Ka"
Andrew E - Rap on "Kaligtasan"
Johnny Krush And Caine - Rap on "Sunglasses"
Mastaplann - Rap on "Wisdomination"

Album Credits 
Executive Producer: Rudy Tee
A & R Executive: Vic Valenciano
All songs are produced by: Francis Magalona except "Luv 4 Lyf" produced by Perfecto De Castro & Francis M, "Wisdomination" produced by Johnny Luna and Butch Velez of True Asiatik Tribe Production & Francis Magalona
All songs are recorded, engineered, tweaked, mixed, mastered and fixed by: Angee Rozul at Tracks Studios except "Meltdown", "Pintados", "Watawat" and "Life Goes By" which was done at: Prodigi Audio by Albert Tamayo

References 

2001 albums
Francis Magalona albums
Pinoy rock albums